Lukáš Galvas (born March 28, 1979) is a Czech former professional ice hockey defenceman who played in the Czech Extraliga (ELH).

Playing career
Galvas played with HC Zlín in the Czech Extraliga during the 2010–11 Czech Extraliga season.

During the 2016–17 Czech Extraliga season, Galvas made history with his son Jakub Galvas by being the first father and son in league history to play against one another.

In the following 2017–18 season, Galvas signed as a free agent with HC Olomouc, in order to play alongside his son, Jakub. In his final professional season of his 21-year career, he was paired defensively alongside his son recording 7 points in 38 games.

References

External links

1979 births
Living people
Czech ice hockey defencemen
HC Karlovy Vary players
HC Oceláři Třinec players
HC Olomouc players
HC Vítkovice players
HC Slezan Opava players
PSG Berani Zlín players
Sportspeople from Opava